East Butte is a  summit located in Bingham County, Idaho, United States.

Description
East Butte and line parent Big Southern Butte were major landmarks for early explorers and pioneers. The remote mountain is situated over 40 miles east of Craters of the Moon National Monument and Preserve, 32 miles west of the community of Idaho Falls, and can be seen from Highway 20 midway between Idaho Falls and Arco at milepost 274. East Butte is set on land belonging to the Idaho National Laboratory so access is restricted even though a road leads to multiple radio towers at the top. This landform's toponym has been officially adopted by the United States Board on Geographic Names.

Geology
East Butte is a lava dome composed of aphanitic rhyolite. It formed around 600,000 years ago as sialic magma flowed through a conduit in the basalt plain which surrounds the peak.

Climate
East Butte is located in a cold semi-arid climate zone with warm summers and cold winters (Köppen BSk). Winter temperatures can drop below 0 °F with wind chill factors below −20 °F. Precipitation is relatively sparse.

Gallery

See also
 Middle Butte
 List of mountain peaks of Idaho

References

External links
 National Geodetic Survey Data Sheet
 East Butte: weather forecast

Mountains of Idaho
Landforms of Bingham County, Idaho
North American 2000 m summits
Pleistocene lava domes